Bunty was a British girls' comic.

Bunty may also refer to:

Given name or nickname
 Bunty Afoa (born 1996), Samoan rugby league footballer
 Bunty Avieson, Australian writer
 Bunty Bailey (born 1964), English model, dancer and actress
 Bunty Bhangdiya, Maharashtra Legislative Assembly member 
 Bunty James (born 1933), British television presenter 
 Bunty Longrigg (1906–1974), English cricketer
 Bunty Stephens (1924–1978), English golfer 
 Bunty Thompson (1925–2017), Australian equestrian 
 Bunty Walia, Indian film producer

Fictional characters
 Bunty Bagshaw, alter ego of Sarah Kennedy, British radio presenter
 Bunty Pulls the Strings, lost 1921 American silent comedy
 Bunty Bubbly Ki Mummy, Indian television series
 Bunty I Love You, Pakistani drama serial
 Bunty Aur Babli, 2005 Indian Hindi-language crime-comedy

See also
 Banty or bandy, an ice hockey sport
 Belle & Bunty, British fashion design partnership
 Bunt (disambiguation)
 Bunti Roy, Indian cricketer
 Bunty Lawless (1935–1956), Canadian racehorse
 Jerome Bunty Chaffee (1825–1886), United States Senator from Colorado